The American Black Film Festival (originally called the Acalpulco Black Film Festival) is an independent film festival that focuses primarily on black film—works by Black members of the film industry. It is held to recognize achievements of film actors of African descent and to honor films that stand out in their portrayal of Black experience.

It has been called "the nation’s most prominent film festival." The festival is held annually and features full-length narratives, short films, mobile entertainment (defined by the official website as "all short form content including experimental films, music videos and webisodes"), and documentaries, all by and/or featuring Black writers, directors, actors, and actresses. The Black Movie Awards are presented at each year's festival.

History

Founding: "Because Hollywouldn't"
The first Acapulco Black Film Festival (ABFF) was held in June 1997. The aim of its founders, Jeff Friday, Byron E. Lewis and Warrington Hudlin, was to create a venue at which members of "Black Hollywood" could meet, network, collaborate, and celebrate Black cinema. In an interview, Friday said that one of the main motivations for the festival was that, "All minorities are shut down from the private party we call Hollywood. We are let in one at a time, and the masses don't get the information, or don't have access to the decision making, or are not in a position to green-light a project. What we have plan[ned] is more of the same, which is more information, more network opportunities, and to further our mission to provide minorities and people of color with a fair shot at breaking into the Hollywood system."

Lewis, CEO of UniWorld Group, and Friday, at the time president of UniWorld’s film division, met with Hudlin, then-president of the Black Filmmakers Foundation, to speak about (and were ultimately inspired to create the festival by) the Rev. Jesse Jackson’s call to boycott the Oscars as a result of the lack of Black nominees that year. The Oscars had historically had a reputation for leaving out Black members of cinema; until 1980, only two African-Americans had won academy awards for acting. The founders of the ABFF decided, though, that rather than investing time and energy in supporting a boycott, they would hold an event of their own to celebrate Black cinematic achievements, and thus the festival was born.

Acapulco Black Film Festival: 1997-2001
In its first years, the festival was held in Acapulco, Mexico. The first annual festival had a turnout of about 600. Over five days, nine independent films were screened and seven awards were given, recognizing "artistic achievement" (male and female), "best actor," "best actress," "best director," "film of the year," and "soundtrack of the year."

In 1998, HBO established the HBO Short Film Award to be presented at the ABFF to honor works in the genre of short film. HBO thus became a major partner and supporter of the ABFF, along with UniWorld and the Black Filmmakers Foundation.

1999 saw the festival’s first Trailblazer award for significant contributions to Black screen media. This award would remain a consistent part of the festival until 2002.

In 2000, the Lincoln Filmmaker’s Trophy was established. This award was one of only two honors, along with the HBO Short Film Award, that would survive the festival’s move to Florida in 2002.

Early hosts and presenters included Robert Townsend (1997), Denzel Washington (1998), Isaac Hayes (1999 and 2000), and Mari Morrow and Kim Whitley who co-hosted the event in 2001.

Aside from awards, the festival in its early incarnations had seminars, actors’ training workshops and meet-and-greets, all with the aim of strengthening the skills and networks of Black filmmakers, actors and actresses, and screenwriters.

Changes from 2002-Present
The year 2002 saw many changes for the film festival. Jeff Friday, who one year previous had purchased UniWorld Film (and rebranded it as Film Life), took over execution of the festival, which he renamed the American Black Film Festival (also abbreviated as ABFF). Since its transformation in 2002, the ABFF has drawn new corporate sponsors (including Grey Goose, Ford, NBC, CBS, and Nickelodeon) and a dramatically increased attendance.

The first Black Movie Awards to be televised were in 2005, with a ceremony hosted by Cedric the Entertainer, which was aired on Turner Network Television; the 2006 ceremony was hosted by Tyler Perry.

The first American Black Film Festival was held in South Beach, Florida on June 26. The Festival stayed in Florida until 2007 when it was moved to Los Angeles, California, in an effort to attract more celebrity attendees and thereby generating more general interest in the festival. While initially successful, the change in venue ultimately resulted in a decline in attendance from members of the actual Black filmmaking community. The festival changed venues once more in 2010, returning to Florida, and it was confirmed that the 2011 festival would be held in South Beach.

The 2011 festival ran from July 6 through July 9.

Festival

Events
Over the course of the festival, there are numerous events held at numerous locations. Typically, there will be an opening ceremony, either featuring a big-name movie or an award presentation. The following three (some years four) days will include screenings of other films, actors’ and directors’ workshops (for example, 2010’s "Master Class on Cinematography led by Cliff Charles"), and symposiums (for example 2010’s "Inside Nickelodeon" symposium). Each year, the festival concludes with the main awards ceremony.
Hosts of this ceremony have included: Robert Townsend and Shaun Robinson (co-hosts), Anthony Anderson, and Niecy Nash.

Advisory board
Below is a list of the ABFF’s current advisory board, and the members’ professional affiliations, as found on the official website.
 Will Packer: Founder & Producer (Will Packer Productions)
 Rob Hardy: Co-Founder (Rainforest Films)
 Jeff Clanagan: President & CEO (Codeblack Entertainment)
 Zola Mashariki: Senior Vice President of Production (Fox Searchlight Pictures)
 Debra Langford: Vice President of Inclusion & Business Diversity (NBC Universal)
 Valerie Watts Meraz: Vice President of Content Acquisitions (Showtime)
 DeVon Franklin: Vice President of Production (Columbia Pictures)
 Robert Townsend: Founding Board Member (Townsend Entertainment)
 Andrea Nelson Meigs: Motion Picture Talent Agent (International Creative Management)

Programming Initiatives
The festival has five objectives, or "Programming Initiatives"  which are:
 Education in the form of programs to teach and help develop the skills of African-Americans in film.
 Artistic Expression through screening of African-American films.
 ‘Collaboration between members of the Black cinema industry thereby strengthening the industry as a whole.
 Access to "industry insiders" for up-and-coming filmmakers and producers.
 Recognition of outstanding work on the part of Black independent filmmakers.

Black Film Awards

Awards and Recipients 1997-2001
Below is a list of award winners and honorees of the Acapulco Black Film Festival.

1997
 Artistic Achievement: Halle Berry and Bill Duke
 Best Actress: Queen Latifah for her role in Set It Off
 Best Actor: Ossie Davis for his role in Get On The Bus
 Best Director: F. Gary Gray for Set It Off
 1996 Film of the Year: Once Upon a Time...When We Were Colored
 1996 Soundtrack of the Year: Set It Off

1998
 Career Achievement Award: Debbie Allen and Morgan Freeman
 Best Film: Tie between Soul Food and Eve's Bayou
 Best Director: Kasi Lemmons for Eve's Bayou
 Best Actor: Samuel L. Jackson for his role in Eve's Bayou
 Best Actress:  Vivica A. Fox for her role in Soul Food
 Best Soundtrack: lovejones
 HBO Short Film Award: Two Seasons

1999
 Trailblazer Award: Byron Lewis
 Career Achievement: Pam Grier and Samuel L. Jackson
 Best Film: The Negotiator
 Best Director: F. Gary Gray for The Negotiator
 Best Actress: Angela Bassett for her role in How Stella Got Her Groove Back
 Best Actor: Larenz Tate for his role in Why Do Fools Fall In Love
 Best Screenplay: Christopher Scott Cherot for Hav Plenty
 Best Soundtrack: The Player’s Club
 HBO Short Film Award: Twin

2000
 Trailblazer Award: Melvin Van Peebles
 Best International Film: Bellyful
 Star of the Year: Nia Long
 Best Film Entrepreneur: Master P
 Best USA Film: One Week
 Best Work in Progress: Seventeen Again
 Lincoln Filmmaker’s Trophy: Carl Seaton
 HBO Short Film Award: My Father’s Hand

2001
 Best U.S. Film: Blue Hill Avenue
 Audience Award for Best International Film: Love Come Down
 Audience Award for Best Work in Progress: Jacked
 HBO Short Film Award: Kickin’ Chicken
 Lincoln Filmmaker Trophy: Raoul Peck
 Coca-Cola Film Score Award: Malcolm Rector
 Career Achievement Award: John Singleton
 Trailblazer Award: Suzanne De Passe
 Rising Star Award: Sanaa Lathan and Anthony Anderson

Awards and Recipients 2002-2010
Below is a list of American Black Film Festival award winners and honorees.

2002
 Blockbuster Award for Best Feature Film: Civil Brand
 HBO Short Film Award: Quest to Ref
 Lincoln Filmmaker Trophy: The Riff
 Career Achievement Award: Robert Townsend
 Best Performance by an Actress: Monica Calhoun, for Pandora's Box
 Rising Star Award: Mekhi Phifer

2003
 Blockbuster Award for Best Feature Film: All About You
 HBO Short Film Award: Swallow
 Lincoln Filmmaker Trophy: Skin Deep
 AOL Time Warner Innovator Award: Russell Simmons
 AOL Time Warner Rising Star Award: Gabrielle Union
 Best Performance by an Actress: Janice Richardson*, for Anne B. Real
 Best Performance by an Actor: Steve White, for Skin Deep

2004
 Time Warner Innovator Award: Spike Lee
 Rising Star Award: Rosario Dawson
 HBO Short Film Award: Time Out
 Blockbuster Audience Award for Best Feature Film: Tie between Love, Sex and Eating the Bones and Woman Thou Art Loosed
 Best Performance by an Actress: Sanaa Lathan, for Out of Time
 Best Performance by an Actor: Chiwetel Ejiofor, for Dirty Pretty Things
 Best Director: F. Gary Gray, for The Italian Job
 Film of the Year: The Fighting Temptations

2005
 Grand Jury Prize for Best Picture: On the One
 HBO Short Film Award: Shards
 Audience Award for Best Narrative Feature: One the One
 The Filmmaker Trophy for Best Narrative Feature: Mario Van Peebles
 Voices of Color Best Documentary Award: Bastards of the Party
 Melvin Van Peebles Trailblazer Award: Warrington Hudlin
 Best Performance by an Actor: On the One

2006
 Grand Jury Prize for Best Picture: My Brother
 HBO Short Film Award: Pop Foul
 Audience Award for Best U.S. Feature: Dirty Laundry
 Voices of Color Best Documentary Award: If I Die Tonight
 Founder’s Award for Outstanding Achievement in Independent Cinema: Christopher Scott, for My Brother
 Define Luxury Commercial Contest Winner: Award Show

2007
 Grand Jury Prize for Best Picture presented by Kodak: South of Pico
 Grand Jury Prize for Best Documentary: Back to our Roots
 Grand Jury Prize for Best Screenplay presented by Allstate: Mansfield 12
 Grand Jury Prize for Best Actor: Henry Simmons
 Grand Jury Prize for Best Director: Craig Ross, Jr.
 Audience Award for Best U.S. Feature: I’m Through With White Girls
 HBO Short Film Award: The Second Coming
 Allstate Beyond February "Be Reel" Contest Winner: Give Along the Way
 Heineken Red Star Award: South of Pico

2008
 Grand Jury Prize for Best Film: The Abduction of Jesse Bookman
 Grand Jury Prize for Best Actor: Mel Jackson for The Abduction of Jesse Bookman
 HBO Short Film Award: Premature
 The Best Documentary presented by BET J: Slaying Goliath
 Allstate Beyond February "Be Reel" Contest Winner: The Lucky Suit
 Target Filmmaker Award for Inspiration to Dream in Color: Pip & Zastrow
 Heineken* Red Star Award: L.A. Proper

2009
 HBO Short Film Award: The Roe Effect
 Grand Jury Prize for Best Narrative Feature: Mississippi Damned
 Grand Jury Prize for Best Documentary: Kirk Fraser, for Len Bias
 Grand Jury Prize for Best Actor: Tessa Thompson, for  Mississippi Damned
 Allstate Beyond February "Be Reel" Film Award: The Broken Sole
 Film Life’s Star Project Winners Best Actress: Khalilah Joi Dubose
 Film Life’s Star Project Winners Best Actor: Bechir Sylvain
 ABFF Audience Award Winner: Blue

2010
 HBO Short Film Competition: Stag & Doe
 Grand Jury Prize for Best Actor: Golden Brooks, for her role in The Inheritance
 Grand Jury Prize for Best Film: Legacy 
 2010 ABFF Star Project Winners: Emayatzy Corinealdi and Stephen Hill
 Rising Icon Award: Chrisette Michele
 Career Achievement Award: Lee Daniels

Influence
Numerous Hollywood insiders, including director Antoine Fuqua (Director of ‘’Training Day’’) and Charlie Jordan Brookins of MTV Films have endorsed the festival, as well as rapper/actor Common who has stated that, "[I]t’s a good vehicle to get out great art that we... want the world to see."

References

Further reading
 Allyson Nadia Field, Uplift Cinema: The Emergence of African-American Film and the Possibility of Black Modernity. Durham, NC: Duke University Press, 2015.

External links
Official Website
Rules and Eligibility (webarchive 23rd December 2016)

American film awards
Film festivals in Florida
African-American film festivals
African Americans in Florida
1997 establishments in Florida
Film festivals established in 1997